The 2018 The Bend SuperSprint (formally known as the 2018 OTR SuperSprint at The Bend Motorsport Park) was a motor racing event for Supercars, held on the weekend of 24–26 August 2018. The event was held at The Bend Motorsport Park near Tailem Bend in South Australia and was the first Supercars event to be held at the circuit. It was the eleventh round of sixteen in the 2018 Supercars Championship and hosted Races 22 and 23 of the season.

Background

Entry alterations
The round was open to wildcard entries from the Super2 Series and saw the grid expanded to twenty-eight cars with the addition of two extra entries – Brad Jones Racing entering a third Holden Commodore ZB for Macauley Jones, and Kostecki Brothers Racing entering their Super2 Holden Commodore VF and driver Kurt Kostecki.

Rookie main game team Matt Stone Racing and driver Todd Hazelwood reverted to the Holden Commodore VF they used to win the 2017 Super2 Series championship.

Results

Practice

Race 22

Qualifying

Race 

Notes
– Garth Tander received a 90-second post-race Time Penalty for failing to complete the CPS requirements for the Race.

Championship standings after Race 22 

Drivers' Championship standings

Teams Championship

 Note: Only the top five positions are included for both sets of standings.

Race 23

Qualifying 

Notes
– Richie Stanaway received a 3-place grid penalty for impeding James Golding in qualifying. But as he qualifies 27th, 2 of the 3 Grid Spot penalties will carry over to the next Event.

Race

Championship standings after Race 23 

Drivers' Championship standings

Teams Championship

 Note: Only the top five positions are included for both sets of standings.

References

The Bend SuperSprint
The Bend SuperSprint